John Wilson (1889 – 20 September 1914) was a Scottish professional footballer who played in the Scottish League for Vale of Leven and Dumbarton as a half back.

Personal life 
Wilson was married. After the outbreak of the First World War in August 1914, he enlisted as a private in The Black Watch (Royal Highlanders) in Auchterarder. Wilson died of wounds at the Hotel Majestic Military Hospital in Paris on 20 September 1914 and was buried in the Cimetière parisien de Bagneux.

Career statistics

References 

1889 births
1914 deaths
Scottish footballers
Association football wing halves
Dumbarton F.C. players
Scottish Football League players
British Army personnel of World War I
British military personnel killed in World War I
Vale of Leven F.C. players
Footballers from Perth and Kinross
Black Watch soldiers
Burials at the Cimetière parisien de Bagneux